The 1911 Chinese provisional presidential election was the election held on 29 December 1911 during the Xinhai Revolution for the First Provisional President and Vice President of the Provisional Government of the Republic of China. Sun Yat-sen and Li Yuan-hung were elected as President and Vice-President respectively. Sun sworn in at midnight on 1 January 1912 and declared the official establishment of the Republic of China.

Electors
One vote was given to each of the seventeen provinces presented in the assembly, including 

Five other provinces were still under Qing control. The protectorates in Outer Mongolia, Inner Mongolia, Tsinghai and Tibet were semi-independent. They did not participate this election.

Results

President

Vice-President

See also
 History of Republic of China
 President of the Republic of China
 Vice President of the Republic of China

References
 中央選舉委員會，中華民國選舉史，台北：中央選舉委員會印行，1987年

Presidential elections in the Republic of China (1912–1949)
1911 in China
China
December 1911 events